XPLORA1: Peter Gabriel's Secret World (or simply XPLORA1) is a musical computer game designed by musician Peter Gabriel.

Summary
The game was intended to promote his 1992 album, Us, and the success of Xplora1 would prompt him to release a similar musically themed interactive game entitled EVE in 1996 as the second of his post-WOMAD projects. The game was first released for Macintosh in 1993, followed by Windows in 1994 and CD-i in 1995, in which the project was completed in collaboration with Brilliant Media under Gabriel's own label Real World Records.

The game was conceived by Brilliant Media's Steve Nelson and pitched to Peter in 1990. The project was developed at Brilliant Media's offices in SOMA, San Francisco, CA. The design and coding for the initial release on Mac CDROM,  was created in HyperCard. Footage included WOMAD and on location at the studio in Bath, UK. The branding, marketing and retail distribution was led by Jane Lalonde at Brian Fargo's Interplay Studios. 
The gameplay consists of a number of sub-games such as scavenger hunts, sliding mixes, music, a secret world, puzzles, etc. In interactive mode the player may watch video interviews with Peter Gabriel, and can explore brief summaries of a number of musicians Gabriel has performed with in the past. As the player completes puzzles and accomplishes goals new areas of the CD are unlocked featuring new content for the player to explore.

Reception
Computer Gaming World said in March 1994 that while the backstage footage was interesting, "explorers will have the most fun remixing their own Peter Gabriel music videos and joining in on jam sessions. Multimedia is a much abused term, but this beautiful work deserves the title".

Xplora1 received 3 awards from the Academy of Interactive Arts & Sciences for:
Best Interactive Product of 1994,
Best Musical, and
Best use of Music

The game sold more than 100,000 copies globally and more than 2,000 copies in Australia.

See also
MusicVR - A similar series of musical concept games designed by fellow musician, Mike Oldfield.
Prince Interactive - A similar game designed by the musician, Prince.

References

External links

1993 video games
CD-i games
Classic Mac OS games
Video games based on musicians
Peter Gabriel
Video games developed in the United Kingdom
Windows games